Walsingham Friary was a Franciscan friary at Walsingham, Norfolk, England. It was founded in 1347 and suppressed in the 16th century in the Dissolution of the Monasteries.

References

Further reading

1347 establishments in England
1537 disestablishments in England
Franciscan monasteries in England
Monasteries in Norfolk
Walsingham